Challwa Q'asa (Quechua challwa fish, q'asa mountain pass, "fish pass", also spelled Chayhuajasa) is a mountain in the Wansu mountain range in the Andes of Peru, about  high. It is located in the Arequipa Region, La Unión Province, Puyca District. It lies northwest of Chhijmuni and Wayta Urqu.

References 

Mountains of Peru
Mountains of Arequipa Region